Ashmit Patel (born 13 January 1978) is an Indian actor who appears in Bollywood films and was seen on Bigg Boss.

Personal life
Patel is the son of Amit Patel and Asha Patel, and the younger brother of actress and model Ameesha Patel, and the grandson of the lawyer-politician Rajni Patel, who was the Congress Pradesh Committee President of Mumbai. His birth name is a blend of the first three letters of his mother's name Asha and the last three letters of his father's name Amit.

His father is a Gujurati while his mother described herself as a "Sindhi Punjabi" in an interview.
 
Patel studied at the Cathedral and John Connon School in Mumbai and later attended the University of Texas at Austin in United States, from which he received a bachelor's degree in Business in 2000.

Career
Patel started his career as an assistant director and worked with Vikram Bhatt in the making of his films, Aap Mujhe Achche Lagne Lage (2002), Awara Paagal Deewana (2002), Raaz (2002) and Footpath (2003). He made his acting debut with the film Inteha directed by Vikram Bhatt. In 2004, he appeared alongside Mallika Sherawat and Emraan Hashmi in the thriller Murder, a Bollywood inspiration of Unfaithful. The film was his first commercial success.

In 2005, Patel starred in Soni Razdan's thriller Nazar and Khalid Mohammed's multi-starrer Silsiilay. Both the films were unsuccessful at the box office. In 2006, he also played leading roles in Dil Diya Hai, Banaras and Fight Club. In 2007, he starred in the comedy Kudiyon Ka Hai Zamana alongside Mahima Chaudhary and Rekha. His next film Toss was released in 2009.

Patel featured as one of the finalists in the fourth season of the Indian television reality show Bigg Boss. He hosted Superstud on UTV Bindass and working on two films, Good Night and Future Toh Bright Hai Jee. He hosted Superdude on UTV Bindass.

He will be marking his digital debut with Ullu App's upcoming web-series titled Peshawar, which is based on 2014 Peshawar school massacre. He will be playing the role of terrorist Abu Shamil, who masterminded the attacks and managed to brainwash the rest of his crew into perpetrating this heinous crime.

Filmography

Assistant Director
 Awara Paagal Deewana (2002) (second assistant director)
 Aap Mujhe Achche Lagne Lage (2002)
 Raaz (2002)
 Footpath (2003)

Television

Web series

References

External links

 
 

Indian male film actors
1978 births
Living people
Gujarati people
Sindhi people
Punjabi people
Bigg Boss (Hindi TV series) contestants
McCombs School of Business alumni